Jandi Swanson (born 1978), is an American former child actress, most recognizable for her role as Jenny Drake in the first season of Baywatch and as Penny Pester in the 1992 film Ladybugs.

Filmography
2003 – I Love Your Work as Eager Fan
1998 – Beverly Hills, 90210 – Mouse (guest role)
1994 – Roseanne: An Unauthorized Biography – Brandi
1992 – Her Final Fury: Betty Broderick, the Last Chapter (TV)
1992 – Ladybugs – Penny Pester
1992 – A Woman Scorned: The Betty Broderick Story (TV)
1991 – American Eyes (TV) – Rico
1990 – The Golden Girls – young Dorothy (guest role)
1989 – Baywatch – Jenny Drake
1988 – Pumpkinhead – Wallace kid
1988 – Star Trek: The Next Generation – Katie (guest role)
1988 – L.A. Law – Katie Seaver (guest role)
1988 – Full House – Karen (guest role)
1987 – Matlock – Wendy Crowley (guest role)
1987 – Less than Zero – Jenny

External links
 

1978 births
Actresses from Boulder, Colorado
American child actresses
American film actresses
American television actresses
Living people
21st-century American women